Credit Union 1 is a credit union based in Rantoul, Illinois.  Its service area spans the Chicago metropolitan area, the northern and central regions of Illinois, the Indianapolis metropolitan area, and the Las Vegas metropolitan area. CU1 serves approximately 89,000 members throughout Illinois, Indiana and Nevada.

This credit union is federally insured by the National Credit Union Administration (NCUA).

History
Credit Union 1 was established as Chanute Military Credit Union in 1958.  The original field of membership was personnel and dependents of Chanute Air Force Base.  In 1978 it was announced that Chanute Air Force Base was a candidate for closure. After the decision was made in March of 1979 to retain Chanute Air Force Base as a viable military technical training center, plans were developed to insulate the credit union from actions of this type in the future. As a result, the credit union made concentrated efforts in 1979 to further develop another segment of potential members, and a merger took place with Fort Sheridan Federal Credit Union. This merger expanded Credit Union 1’s field of membership to the Military Reserve and National Guard Units in Illinois. The next expansion CU1 experienced was changing the field of membership from “occupational” to “associational”. This meant CU1’s field of membership was no longer restricted to military affiliation.

Since then, Credit Union 1 has continued to grow and progress through mergers and acquisitions, as well as growing “Select Employee Groups” (SEGs). CU1 is highly regarded in the credit union community and has been a solid merger partner for several credit unions, consolidating to make a more dynamic credit union. The progression also added diversity and opportunity in new markets. 

The primary SEGs include all State of Illinois employees, all Cook County employees, students and faculty of University of Illinois at Chicago, UI Health, students and faculty of Eastern Illinois University, Navistar, Tribune Companies, AON Corporation, Elmhurst Memorial Hospital employees, Alzheimer’s Association, Hyatt Hotels and a number of other companies and organizations.

References

External links
 Credit Union 1 Official website

Companies based in Champaign County, Illinois
Credit unions based in Illinois
Credit unions based in Indiana
Credit unions based in Nevada
 
Lombard, Illinois
Organizations established in 1949 
Organizations established in 1958 
Organizations established in 1965 
Rantoul, Illinois
1958 establishments in Illinois